Chinese Taipei competed at the 2022 World Games held in Birmingham, United States from 7 to 17 July 2022. Athletes representing Chinese Taipei won one gold medal, six silver medals and six bronze medals. The country finished in 33rd place in the medal table.

Medalists

Invitational sports

Competitors
The following is the list of number of competitors in the Games.

Air sports

Chinese Taipei competed in drone racing.

Bowling

Chinese Taipei competed in bowling.

Canoe polo

Chinese Taipei competed in canoe polo.

Cue sports

Chinese Taipei won one silver medal in cue sports.

Finswimming

Chinese Taipei competed in finswimming.

Ju-jitsu

Chinese Taipei competed in ju-jitsu.

Karate

Chinese Taipei competed in karate.

Men

Women

Korfball

Chinese Taipei won the bronze medal in the korfball tournament.

Powerlifting

Chinese Taipei won two silver medals in powerlifting.

Road speed skating

Chinese Taipei won three medals in road speed skating.

Softball

Chinese Taipei won the bronze medal in the softball tournament.

Sumo

Chinese Taipei competed in sumo.

Track speed skating

Chinese Taipei won two bronze medals in track speed skating.

Tug of war

Chinese Taipei won one gold medal in tug of war.

Water skiing

Chinese Taipei competed in water skiing.

Wushu

Chinese Taipei won two medals in wushu.

References

Nations at the 2022 World Games
2022
World Games